Yeldersley is a manor mentioned in the Domesday book. It is located near Ashbourne in Derbyshire. Today there is Yeldersley Hall. This hamlet had a population of 200 in 1831.

Notable residents
Catherine Pegge was born here in the seventeenth century.

See also
Listed buildings in Yeldersley

References

Hamlets in Derbyshire
Derbyshire Dales
Civil parishes in Derbyshire